Rhodoferax saidenbachensis is a Gram-negative and rod-shaped bacterium from the genus Rhodoferax which has been isolated from fresh water of the Saidenbach reservoir in Germany.

References

Comamonadaceae
Bacteria described in 2014